The first season of the American psychological thriller television series You, based on the novel of the same name by Caroline Kepnes, was ordered by Lifetime in April 2017. It stars Penn Badgley, Elizabeth Lail, Luca Padovan, Zach Cherry and Shay Mitchell. The 10-episode first season, which premiered on September 9, 2018, was produced by A&E Studios, in association with Alloy Entertainment, Berlanti Productions, and Warner Horizon Television; the showrunners were Greg Berlanti, Sera Gamble and Leslie Morgenstein.

Synopsis
The first season follows Joe Goldberg, a bookstore manager in New York, who meets Guinevere Beck, an aspiring writer, with whom he becomes immediately infatuated. To feed his sociopathic obsession, he soon turns to social media and technology to track her presence and eliminate any possible obstacles that stand in the way of their romance.

Cast and characters

Main 
 Penn Badgley as Joe Goldberg, a serial killer and bookstore manager at Mooney's who stalks and then dates Beck
 Elizabeth Lail as Guinevere Beck, a struggling graduate student and an aspiring writer
 Luca Padovan as Paco, Joe's young neighbor
 Zach Cherry as Ethan Russell, a bookstore clerk who works with Joe
 Shay Mitchell as Peach Salinger, Beck's wealthy best friend

Recurring 
 Daniel Cosgrove as Ron, the abusive boyfriend of Claudia and a parole officer
 Kathryn Gallagher as Annika, one of Beck's friends, a social media influencer
 Nicole Kang as Lynn, another one of Beck's friends
 Victoria Cartagena as Claudia, Paco's mother
 Mark Blum as Mr. Mooney, the owner of Mooney's and Joe's boss
 Hari Nef as Blythe, a rival graduate student to Beck
 John Stamos as Dr. Nicky, Beck's therapist

Guest 
 Reg Rogers as Professor Paul Leahy, Beck's graduate school advisor who is sexually interested in her
 Lou Taylor Pucci as Ben "Benji" Ashby, Beck's wealthy, toxic sex partner
 Michael Park as Edward Beck, Beck's father
 Emily Bergl as Nancy Whitesell, Edward's new wife and Beck's stepmother
 Michael Maize as Officer Nico, a Greenwich police officer
 Gerrard Lobo as Raj, a med student and an old friend of Beck and Peach
 Ambyr Childers as Candace, Joe's ex-girlfriend and a fledgling musician
 Natalie Paul as Karen Minty, Paco's babysitter and Joe's new girlfriend after his breakup with Beck
 Ryan Andes as Ross, a private investigator hired by Peach's family to look into her death

Episodes

Production
Penn Badgley was cast as lead character Joe Goldberg in June 2017. Elizabeth Lail's casting as Guinevere Beck was announced in July 2017, as well as Luca Padovan as Joe's neighbor Paco, and Zach Cherry as Ethan, a bookstore clerk who works with Joe. Shay Mitchell was cast as Peach Salinger, Beck's wealthy best friend, in August 2017.

In September 2017, Hari Nef was cast in the recurring role as Blythe, a talented and competitive peer in Beck's MFA program. A few days later, it was announced that Daniel Cosgrove had been cast in the recurring role of Ron, a parole officer. In October 2017, Michael Maize and Ambyr Childers were cast in the recurring roles of Officer Nico and Candace, respectively. It was announced in November 2017 that John Stamos would recur as Dr. Nicky, Beck's therapist.

The first season of You was filmed in New York City and wrapped on December 19, 2017.

Reception

Ratings

Critical response
The first season received positive reviews from critics. The review aggregator website Rotten Tomatoes, reports a 93% approval rating for the first season with an average rating of 6.97/10 based on 58 reviews. The website's critical consensus reads, "You pairs thrilling drama with trashy fun to create an addictive social media horror story that works its way under the skin – and stays there." Metacritic, which uses a weighted average, assigned the season a score of 74 out of 100 based on 29 critics, indicating "generally favorable" reviews.

Alicia Lutes of IGN gave the first season, a 8.4/10, stating that it is "so insane, you're bound to be riveted and engaged if nothing else" and that the series is "a horrifying love letter to all those romantic ideals and expectations that have permeated our society." Liz Miller from IndieWire gave the first season an "A−" grade, mentioning in a positive review, that it invokes "the best qualities of David Fincher's Gone Girl and Mary Harron's adaptation of American Psycho," and that the series "juxtaposes the idea of love as glamorized by the romance industrial complex with its dark side." Kylie Nixon from Stuff complimented the first season in her review by adding that the "show will mess with your head. You might feel super, super awkward a couple or fifty times, but by God, you'll be entertained."

Tiffany Kelly from Daily Dot recommended the first season in her review of the series by stating that it "quickly evolves into a disturbing profile of a psychopath in the digital age, one who uses social media to aid his stalking." While reviewing the first season, Anna Leszkiewicz from New Statesman declared in a positive review that "You does what it says on the tin – offering surprise twists, drip-fed reveals, a magnetic villain in Joe, the horrible suspense of knowing more than his clueless victims and satisfyingly gory murders." Christina Radish of Collider named Joe Goldberg as the "Best TV Villain" of 2018. Radish wrote that, "thanks to the performance given by Penn Badgley and some terrific writing, the character has layers that make him complicated and intriguing, even though you know he should be making you cringe and recoil. Joe Goldberg is a character that does horrible things, but also keeps you so engrossed that you can't stop watching."

Critics' year-end lists

Notes

References

External links

2018 American television seasons
Season 1
Television series about social media